¿Quién es la máscara? may refer to the following versions of the King of Mask Singer program:

¿Quién es la máscara? (Mexican TV series) - Mexican version released in 2019.
¿Quién es la máscara? (Chilean TV series) - Chilean version released in 2021.
¿Quién es la máscara? (Colombian TV series) - Colombian version released in 2021.
¿Quién es la máscara? (Uruguayan TV series) - Uruguayan version released in 2022.
¿Quién es la máscara? (Argentine TV series) - Argentine version released in 2022.